{{safesubst:#invoke:RfD|||month = March
|day = 15
|year = 2023
|time = 02:58
|timestamp = 20230315025855

|content=
REDIRECT Mary of Teck

}}